The Sopwith Pup is a British single-seater biplane fighter aircraft built by the Sopwith Aviation Company. It entered service with the  Royal Naval Air Service and the Royal Flying Corps in the autumn of 1916. With pleasant flying characteristics and good manoeuvrability, the aircraft proved very successful. The Pup was eventually outclassed by newer German fighters, but it was not completely replaced on the Western Front until the end of 1917. Remaining Pups were relegated to Home Defence and training units. The Pup's docile flying characteristics also made it ideal for use in aircraft carrier deck landing and takeoff experiments and training.

Design and development

In 1915, Sopwith produced a personal aircraft for the company's test pilot Harry Hawker, a single-seat, tractor biplane powered by a seven-cylinder  Gnome rotary engine which was known as Hawker's Runabout. Another four similar aircraft have been tentatively identified as Sopwith Sparrows. Sopwith next developed a larger and more powerful aircraft as a fighter that was heavily influenced by this design, although controlled laterally with ailerons rather than by wing warping.

The resulting aircraft was a single-bay, single-seat biplane with a fabric-covered wooden framework and staggered equal-span wings. The cross-axle type main landing gear was supported by V-struts attached to the lower fuselage longerons. The prototype and most production Pups were powered by the  Le Rhône 9C rotary engine. Armament was a single  Vickers machine gun synchronized with the Sopwith-Kauper synchronizer.

A prototype was completed in February 1916 and sent to Upavon for testing in late March. The Royal Naval Air Service (RNAS) quickly ordered two more prototypes, then placed a production order. Sopwith was heavily engaged in production of the 1 Strutter, and produced only a small number of Pups for the RNAS. Deliveries commenced in August 1916.

The Royal Flying Corps (RFC) also placed large orders for Pups. The RFC orders were undertaken by sub-contractors Standard Motor Co. and Whitehead Aircraft. Deliveries did not commence until the beginning of 1917. 1,796 Pups were built, including 96 by Sopwith, 850 by Standard Motor Co., 820 by Whitehead Aircraft, and 30 by William Beardmore & Co.

Operational history

In May 1916, the RNAS received its first Pups for operational trials with "A" Naval Squadron. The first Pups reached the Western Front in October 1916 with No. 8 Squadron RNAS, and proved successful, with the squadron's Pups claiming 20 enemy machines destroyed in operations over the Somme battlefield by the end of the year. The first RFC Squadron to re-equip with the Pup was No. 54 Squadron, which arrived in France in December. The Pup quickly proved its superiority over the early Fokker, Halberstadt and Albatros biplanes. After encountering the Pup in combat, Manfred von Richthofen said, "We saw at once that the enemy aeroplane was superior to ours."

The Pup's light weight and generous wing area gave it a good rate of climb. Agility was enhanced by having ailerons on both wings. The Pup had half the horsepower and armament of the German Albatros D.III, but was much more manoeuvrable, especially over  due to its low wing loading. Ace James McCudden stated that "When it came to manoeuvring, the Sopwith [Pup] would turn twice to an Albatros' once ... it was a remarkably fine machine for general all-round flying. It was so extremely light and well surfaced that after a little practice one could almost land it on a tennis court." However, the Pup was also longitudinally unstable.

At the peak of its operational deployment, the Pup equipped only four RNAS squadrons (Nos. 3, 4, 8 and 9), and three RFC squadrons (Nos. 54, 46 and 66). By the spring of 1917, the Pup had been outclassed by the newest German fighters. The RNAS replaced their Pups, first with Sopwith Triplanes, and then with Sopwith Camels. The RFC soldiered on with Pups, in spite of increasing casualties, until it was possible to replace them with Camels in December 1917.

Home Defence duties
The raids on London by Gotha bombers in mid-1917 caused far more damage and casualties than the earlier airship raids. The ineffective response by British interceptor units had serious political repercussions. In response, No. 66 Squadron was withdrawn to Calais for a short period, and No. 46 was transferred for several weeks to Sutton's Farm airfield near London. Two new Pup squadrons were formed specifically for Home Defence duties, No. 112 in July, and No. 61 in August.

The first Pups delivered to Home Defence units utilised the  Le Rhône, but subsequent Home Defence Pups standardised on the more powerful  Gnome Monosoupape, which provided improved rate of climb. These aircraft were distinguishable by the addition of vents in the cowling face. In 1917, the Admiralty acquired the Sopwith Pup.

Shipboard use

Sopwith Pups were also used in many pioneering carrier experiments. On 2 August 1917, a Pup flown by Sqn Cdr Edwin Harris Dunning became the first aircraft to land aboard a moving ship, . Dunning was killed on his third landing when the Pup fell over the side of the ship. The Pup began operations on the carriers in early 1917; the first aircraft were fitted with skid undercarriages in place of the standard landing gear. Landings utilised a system of deck wires to "trap" the aircraft. Later versions reverted to the normal undercarriage. A number of other Pups were deployed to cruisers and battleships where they were launched from platforms attached to gun turrets. A Pup flown from a platform on the cruiser  shot down the German Zeppelin L 23 off the Danish coast on 21 August 1917.

The U.S. Navy also employed the Sopwith Pup with Australian pilot Edgar Percival testing the use of carrier-borne fighters. In 1926, Percival flew a Pup from a platform on turret "B" on the battleship  at Guantánamo Bay, Cuba prior to the ship undergoing a major refit that added catapults on the stern.

Training duties
The Pup saw extensive use as a trainer. Student pilots completing basic flight training in the Avro 504k often graduated to the Pup as an advanced trainer. The Pup was also used in Fighting School units for instruction in combat techniques. Many training Pups were reserved by senior officers and instructors as their personal runabouts while a few survived in France as personal or squadron 'hacks' long after the type had been withdrawn from combat.

Nomenclature
The Pup was officially named the Sopwith Scout. The "Pup" nickname arose because pilots considered it to be the "pup" of the larger two-seat Sopwith 1 1/2 Strutter. The name never had official status as it was felt to be "undignified," but a precedent was set, and all later Sopwith types apart from the Triplane acquired animal names (Camel, Dolphin, Snipe etc.), which ended up with the Sopwith firm being said to have created a "flying zoo" during the First World War.

Variants 

Sopwith Admiralty Type 9901
Admiralty designation.
Sopwith Pup (official designation Sopwith Scout)
Single-seat scout (fighter) biplane; 1,770 built.
Sopwith Dove
Two-seat civilian biplane; ten built.
Alcock Scout
Aircraft built partially from the remains of a crashed Pup and other aircraft; one built.
Beardmore W.B.III
Shipboard variant designed to fold into smallest possible volume; 100 built.

Operators 

Australian Flying Corps
No. 5 (Training) Squadron AFC in the United Kingdom.
No. 6 (Training) Squadron AFC in the United Kingdom.
No. 8 (Training) Squadron AFC in the United Kingdom.
Central Flying School AFC at Point Cook, Victoria
Royal Australian Air Force
No. 1 Flying Training School RAAF at Point Cook, Victoria

Belgium Air Force
5me Escadrille de Chasse

Hellenic Navy

Imperial Japanese Army
Imperial Japanese Navy

Royal Netherlands Air Force

Romanian Air Corps

Imperial Russian Air Force

Soviet Air Force – ex-Imperial Russian Air Force.

Royal Flying Corps / Royal Air Force
No. 36 Squadron RAF
No. 46 Squadron RAF
No. 50 Squadron RAF
No. 54 Squadron RAF
No. 61 Squadron RAF
No. 64 Squadron RAF
No. 65 Squadron RAF
No. 66 Squadron RAF
No. 81 Squadron RAF
No. 87 Squadron RAF
No. 89 Squadron RAF
No. 92 Squadron RAF
No. 112 Squadron RAF
No. 141 Squadron RAF
No. 187 Squadron RAF
No. 188 Squadron RAF
No. 189 Squadron RAF
No. 203 Squadron RAF

Royal Naval Air Service

United States Navy

Survivors

 B1807 – Pup under restoration to airworthy condition. Built by Standard Motors in 1917 and delivered to a Home Defence squadron. This aircraft was originally fitted with a  Gnome Monosoupape engine, along with the distinctive three-quarter vented cowling. It was refitted by the  Le Rhône engine sometime in 1918. B1807 was sold at Croydon in 1920 and entered the civil register as G-EAVX. It appeared on 16 July at the 1921 Aerial Derby at Hendon, where it was groundlooped by its pilot. The wings were removed and the fuselage disappeared until 1973, when the current owner discovered the remains of the aircraft in a barn in Dorset.
 N5182 – Pup on static display at the Royal Air Force Museum Cosford in Cosford, Shropshire. Built by Sopwith Aviation Co. at Kingston upon Thames in 1916. N5182 was operated by several RNAS squadrons in Belgium and Northern France. It was flown by the noted aces Edward Grange and Robert A. Little, both of whom scored victories with the aircraft. A private collector acquired N5182 from the French Air Force in 1959 and restored it to airworthy condition. N5182 was acquired by the museum in 1982.
 N5195 – Pup on static display at the Museum of Army Flying in Middle Wallop, Hampshire. Served in the Royal Naval Air Service in France.
 3004/14 – Dove maintained in airworthy condition by the Shuttleworth Collection in Old Warden, Bedfordshire. Delivered in 1919 as a 2-seater Dove, then converted to Pup configuration in the 1930s. It is powered by a Le Rhône 9C rotary engine. In 2004/5 the aircraft was extensively refurbished in the colours of 9917, a Beardmore-built aircraft which was fitted with Le Prieur rockets when it served for a time on HMS Manxman, a seaplane carrier. It is registered as G-EBKY.

Specifications (80 hp Le Rhône)

See also

References

Bibliography
 Bruce, J.M. The Aeroplanes of the Royal Flying Corps. London: Putnam Publishing, Second edition 1992. .
 Bruce, J.M. "The Sopwith Pup". Aircraft in Profile, Volume 1/Part 2. Windsor, Berkshire, UK: Profile Publications Ltd., Fourth revised edition 1976, First edition 1965. .

 Bruce, J.M. "The Sopwith Pup: Historic Military Aircraft No 6". Flight, 1 January 1954, pp. 8–12.
 Bruce, J.M., Gordon Page and Ray Sturtivant. The Sopwith Pup. Tonbridge, Kent, UK: Air-Britain (Historians) Ltd., 2002. .
 Franks, Norman and Harry Dempsey. Sopwith Pup Aces of World War I (Aircraft of the Aces). London: Osprey Publishing, 2005. .

 Robertson, Bruce. Sopwith – The Man and His Aircraft. London: Harleyford, 1970. .
 Thetford, Owen. British Naval Aircraft since 1912. London: Putnam, Fourth edition 1978. .
 Thomas, Andrew. "In the Footsteps of Daedulus: Early Greek Naval Aviation". Air Enthusiast, No. 94, July–August 2001, pp. 8–9. 
 Winchester, Jim, ed. "Sopwith Pup Naval Fighter". Biplanes, Triplanes and Seaplanes (Aviation Factfile). London: Grange Books plc, 2004. .

External links 

 Sopwith Pup – British Aircraft Directory
 First public flight of Brian Coughlin's Le Rhône 9C rotary-powered Sopwith Pup repro at Old Rhinebeck

1910s British fighter aircraft
Military aircraft of World War I
Pup
Aircraft first flown in 1916
Rotary-engined aircraft